The Limerick Senior Football Championship is an annual Gaelic football competition contested by the top Limerick GAA clubs. The champions qualify to represent Limerick in the Munster Senior Club Football Championship, the winners of which progress to the All-Ireland Senior Club Football Championship.

Top winners

Roll of honour

References

External links
Official Limerick Website
Limerick on Hoganstand
Limerick Club GAA

 
Senior Gaelic football county championships
Gaelic football competitions in County Limerick